Wolstan is an unusual variant spelling of Wulstan and Wulfstan.

Of the following Wulfstans, the spelling Wolstan typically refers to St. Wulfstan II.
Wulfstan, ealdorman of Wiltshire (or Weohstan), died 802
Wulfstan of Hedeby, 9th century merchantman and traveller
Wulfstan (died 956), Archbishop of York
Wulfstan (died 1023), Bishop of Worcester, Bishop of London and Archbishop of York
Wulfstan (died 1095), Bishop of Worcester (sometimes known as St. Wulfstan II)
Wulfstan the Cantor (c.960 – early 11th century), monk and poet
Wolstanus, 10th century bishop of London

As a given name, the spelling is almost unique to:
 Wolstan Dixie, Lord Mayor of London
 his grand-nephew Wolstan Dixie and many other Wolstans of the Dixie baronets